Emir Spahić (born 18 August 1980) is a Bosnian former professional footballer who played as a centre back.

During his club career, he represented teams in his homeland, Croatia, Russia, France, Spain and Germany.

He earned a total of 94 international caps, scoring 6 goals, and was the captain of the Bosnia and Herzegovina national team from 2008 until the end of the 2014 FIFA World Cup.

Club career
Over the course of his career, Spahić played for Zagreb, Shinnik Yaroslavl, Lokomotiv Moscow and Anzhi Makhachkala.

He played for Zagreb and Leverkusen in the Champions League and with Montpellier, Sevilla and Lokomotiv in the Europa League.

Montpellier
On 24 June 2009, Spahić announced that he would join newly promoted Montpellier for the 2009–10 Ligue 1 season. On his league debut against Paris Saint-Germain, he scored a header in the 94th minute for a 1–1 draw, earning his side a point.

Sevilla

On 4 July 2011, Spahić agreed a transfer with Spanish side Sevilla for €2 million until July 2014. His national teammate Miroslav Stevanović also transferred to Sevilla in January 2013 and upon his arrival at San Pablo International Airport, he was received by Spahić. Spahić scored his first goal for Sevilla on 5 January 2013 in a 1–0 victory against Osasuna.

Anzhi Makhachkala
On 26 February 2013, Spahić left Sevilla on loan to Anzhi Makhachkala of the Russian Premier League. He scored his first goal for the club on 14 April 2013 against Volga Nizhny Novgorod.

Bayer Leverkusen

On 28 June 2013, Spahić was signed by Bayer Leverkusen of the German Bundesliga on a two-year contract. He conceded a penalty and was later sent off in a Champions League last-16 first-leg game on 18 February 2014, as Paris Saint-Germain beat Leverkusen 4–0. On 20 April, he scored his first two goals for the club in a 4–1 league victory against 1. FC Nürnberg.

On 30 August 2014, 34-year-old Spahić headed in a goal from a free kick to level the score at 2–2 in a game that finished 4–2 for Leverkusen against Hertha BSC, thus ensuring his team's unbeaten start to the season.

Spahić was sent off for two yellow cards in a 4–5 home defeat against VfL Wolfsburg on 14 February 2015; having been 1–4 down, the score was level at his time of dismissal.

On 30 March 2015, Spahić was named the best defender in Europe (in front of Martín Demichelis of Manchester City, Mats Hummels of Borussia Dortmund, Chris Smalling of Manchester United and Thiago Silva of PSG) by International Centre for Sports Studies (CIES). Spahić had his contract terminated on 12 April for headbutting a member of club's security personnel reportedly after they refused to allow his friends entry inside the dressing room area.

Hamburger SV
On 5 July 2015, fellow Bundesliga team Hamburger SV confirmed Spahić as the team's newest player, signing a one-year contract lasting until June 2016. He credited the move to his compatriot, former Hamburg player Sergej Barbarez, and expressed gratefulness at being given a second chance after his expulsion from Leverkusen. He was released by the club on 3 January 2017.

International career

On 7 June 2003, Spahić made his debut as a substitute against Romania at Stadionul Ion Oblemenco in Craiova. On 28 February 2006, he scored his first international goal, in a friendly game against Japan, played in Dortmund.

Ever since his debut, he was an important member of the national team and served as their captain for a number of years. He headed a ball into the box and assisted Ermin Bičakčić who scored a crucial equalizer versus Slovakia in Žilina during the 2014 FIFA World Cup qualifiers. Bosnia and Herzegovina came back from one goal down in that game to win 2–1 and stay top of their qualifying group for ahead of Greece.

Spahić retired from international football on 7 August 2014. After his retirement, Bosnia lost their first game of Euro 2016 qualifiers versus Cyprus (ranked 121 places behind Bosnia in FIFA Ranking for August 2014) without Spahić, which resulted in manager Safet Sušić calling him back from retirement on 22 September for the games that followed against Wales and Belgium. At the time, Bosnia's key defenders were either injured or lacked competitive matches for their clubs, which prompted in Spahić's call-up to the national side. Due to injury, he missed those two games and later returned to international stage against Israel on 16 November where he played the full game, his first since playing against Iran at the 2014 FIFA World Cup.

On 29 May 2016, he scored in a 3–1 friendly loss to Spain in St. Gallen, Switzerland, and was sent off before half time for an altercation with Cesc Fàbregas.

Personal life
Spahić is an ethnic Bosniak. His father is from Sandžak, and his mother is from Gacko. They met when they were both working in Dubrovnik. Emir has two brothers, the older being Nermin and younger one Alen, who is also a football player. Spahić is a first cousin of fellow national team player Edin Džeko.

Spahić is a fan of tennis, and has followed live matches in Dubai, Barcelona, Montpellier and Paris.

He is enrolled at the University of Sarajevo, majoring in sport and physical education.

Aside from his native Bosnian, Spahić speaks English, Spanish, French, German and Russian to varying degrees of fluency.

On 30 August 2019, Spahić was involved in a car accident, when his SUV rolled over on the road, sustaining multiple, but not life-threatening injuries.

Career statistics

International

Scores and results list Bosnia and Herzegovina's goal tally first.

Honours
Zagreb
1. HNL: 2001–02

Lokomotiv Moscow
Russian Cup: 2006–07

References

External links

1980 births
Living people
People from Dubrovnik
Bosnia and Herzegovina people of Montenegrin descent
Croatian Muslims
Association football central defenders
Bosnia and Herzegovina footballers
Bosnia and Herzegovina under-21 international footballers
Bosnia and Herzegovina international footballers
2014 FIFA World Cup players
NK Čelik Zenica players
NK GOŠK Dubrovnik players
NK Zagreb players
FC Shinnik Yaroslavl players
FC Torpedo Moscow players
FC Lokomotiv Moscow players
Montpellier HSC players
Sevilla FC players
FC Anzhi Makhachkala players
Bayer 04 Leverkusen players
Hamburger SV players
Premier League of Bosnia and Herzegovina players
Second Football League (Croatia) players
Croatian Football League players
Russian Premier League players
Ligue 1 players
La Liga players
Bundesliga players
Bosnia and Herzegovina expatriate footballers
Expatriate footballers in Russia
Bosnia and Herzegovina expatriate sportspeople in Russia
Expatriate footballers in France
Bosnia and Herzegovina expatriate sportspeople in France
Expatriate footballers in Spain
Bosnia and Herzegovina expatriate sportspeople in Spain
Expatriate footballers in Germany
Bosnia and Herzegovina expatriate sportspeople in Germany
Violence in sports